Bloomberg Television (on-air as Bloomberg) is an American-based pay television network focusing on business and capital market programming, owned by Bloomberg L.P. It is distributed globally, reaching over 310 million homes worldwide. It is headquartered in New York City, with European headquarters in London and Asian headquarters in Hong Kong.

History
Bloomberg Television first launched in the United States in mid-1994 under the name Bloomberg Direct and was first carried on the then new satellite television service DirecTV. Within a year it was renamed Bloomberg Information TV, before it was shortened to its current name in 1997. The network has taken over the channel space of the-defunct Financial News Network, as well as hiring most of the former FNN workforce. Shortly after Bloomberg's launch, the now-defunct American Independent Network carried a simulcast of the channel at various times each weekday from 1995 to 1997, which was picked up by some broadcast stations in early morning periods to provide a de facto morning business show. Starting on July 1, 1995 the network's morning pre-opening bell programming (from 5:30 AM to 7 AM) was also aired on the USA Network, simulcast in a paid programming arrangement with the channel until 2004, when that network dropped the simulcast months before the NBCUniversal merger was consummated, due to concerns that USA would then air the coverage of a competitor to future sister network CNBC. The simulcast then moved to E! (which also became NBCUniversal-owned and sister network of CNBC in January 2011 due to that company's purchase by Comcast), where it remained until the simulcast ended in January 2009, when it was felt it had expanded digital cable footprint enough to discontinue the simulcast. During its time on E!, the 5–8 a.m. block was the most-watched period for the network, according to Nielsen Media Research.

Bloomberg Television's U.S. network debuted a new graphics package in January 2009. This current scheme was first used on the network's now-defunct pre-market program, Starting Bell, before the new graphics expanded to all of the network's programs on February 17, 2009. Also on that date, Bloomberg U.S. revamped its weekday programming lineup (see "Programs on Bloomberg" below).

In October 2009, Bloomberg Television debuted another new graphics package. In 2011, Bloomberg Television announced a strategic relationship with Gas Station TV (GSTV) to deliver personal finance and business news through the LCD screens beginning to proliferate fueling stations (currently, Cheddar is GSTV's business news provider).

Bloomberg launched a high definition simulcast feed on May 9, 2011, with Time Warner Cable as the first provider to carry it. In mid-April 2013, DirecTV started carrying Bloomberg HD.

As of July 2014, Bloomberg Television's standard-definition feed now shows a down-scaled version of its native HD feed, with the 16:9 letterbox picture on its 4:3 SD feed. In May 2020, the network launched a 2160p 4K feed, using the larger screen space to communicate more news and information; it is currently exclusive to Samsung TV Plus, an ad-supported streaming service.

International channels
In February 2009, Bloomberg Television announced that it would cease operating some of the international variations of the channel, placing a greater focus on a more international Bloomberg channel.

On March 9, 2009, the localized channels available in Germany, France, Italy and Spain ceased operations. Today, throughout Europe, the original pan-European version of Bloomberg Europe (International) is available on cable and digital television providers.

Since March 9, 2009, Bloomberg Television utilizes its existing international production teams in Hong Kong (Bloomberg Asia), Europe (Bloomberg Europe) and America (Bloomberg), adding a more global feel to the channel. Bloomberg International provides programming from Hong Kong in the early morning, produced by Bloomberg Asia (International), from London in the late morning, produced by Bloomberg Europe (International), and from its main headquarters in New York City in the afternoon. Each Bloomberg receives localized advertising and a relevant business news ticker on screen.

Bloomberg Japan ceased broadcasting on April 30, 2009. The channel was replaced by Bloomberg Asia (International). Bloomberg Japan's Japanese language print newsroom and website continue to operate as normal. In June 2009, the Japanese service began running small on-air segments in cooperation with BS-Fuji Television. In October 2009, segments produced with the Tokyo Broadcasting System were added. Bloomberg Brazil and Bloomberg Latin America were integrated into the global Bloomberg channel during 2009.

Bloomberg is an associate member of the Caribbean Cable & Telecommunications Association and the Caribbean Cable Cooperative.

In November 2011, Bloomberg announced the formation of Bloomberg TV Mongolia in partnership with Trade and Development Bank of Mongolia (TDB), the oldest and one of the largest commercial banks in Mongolia. The channel offers a mix of locally produced, Mongolian language content as well as English language news from Bloomberg Television.

In February 2015, Bloomberg partnered with Canadian media company Channel Zero to form Bloomberg TV Canada, which featured U.S. Bloomberg Television programming and Canadian-produced studio programs produced from Bloomberg's Brookfield Place studio and other Canadian bureaus. The channel replaced the U.S. service on Canadian television providers. The channel shut down in October 2017, after which Bloomberg entered into a partnership with Bell Media's Business News Network (BNN), to co-brand the channel as BNN Bloomberg, and grant the company rights to distribute its television and radio content in Canada. The co-branded service will augment BNN's existing business day programming with additional Bloomberg programs to handle coverage of international markets, and access to its bureaus.

Current channels
Most of the channels listed are not directly operated by Bloomberg, but are operated by local companies which franchise the Bloomberg brand and may take some of its English-language programming.

 Bloomberg Television (from Bloomberg Tower, Manhattan, New York City)
 Bloomberg El Financiero (from Mexico in Spanish and English)
 Bloomberg TV Malaysia (from Malaysia in Malay and English) 
 Bloomberg Television Asia Pacific (from Hong Kong)
 Bloomberg Television Middle East (from Dubai)
 Bloomberg Television Europe (from London)
 Bloomberg London (from London)
 Bloomberg HT (from Istanbul in Turkish)
 Bloomberg Television Mongolia (from Ulaanbaatar in Mongolian)
 Bloomberg Television South Asia (from Mumbai)
 Bloomberg Television Australia (from Sydney)
 Bloomberg Television Bulgaria (from Sofia in Bulgarian)
 Bloomberg Television Brazil (from São Paulo)
 BNN Bloomberg

Former channels
 Bloomberg Brazil (from São Paulo in Portuguese)
 Bloomberg Television Indonesia (from Jakarta in Indonesian)
 Bloomberg Television Canada
 Bloomberg Television India (from New Delhi)
 Bloomberg Germany (in German)
 Bloomberg Television France (in French)
 Bloomberg Italy (in Italian)
 Bloomberg Television Philippines (in English and Filipino)
 Bloomberg Japan (in Japanese)
 Bloomberg Spain (in Spanish)
 Bloomberg Television Africa (launched October 2013, closed in April 2015)

United States service
Bloomberg's U.S. broadcasts are headed by Justin Smith, the CEO of Bloomberg Media Group. Smith replaced Andy Lack, who eventually returned to NBC News. The network also provided funding and studio facilities for the nightly PBS/WNET program Charlie Rose.

Programs

Live weekday shows

Weekday schedule begins Sunday 6pm (ET), 11pm (UK), Monday 12am (CET) and 6am (HK). Weekend schedule begins on Friday/Saturday at the same times.

Bloomberg Television Australia (from Sydney)

Bloomberg Television Asia Pacific (from Hong Kong)

Bloomberg Television Middle East (from Dubai)

Bloomberg London (from London)

Bloomberg Television Europe (from London)

Bloomberg Television (from Bloomberg Tower, Manhattan, New York City)

Weekly shows
 Bloomberg Wall Street Week (from Wall Street, Manhattan, New York City)
 Best of Bloomberg Technology with Emily Chang
 Bloomberg Best
 Bloomberg Businessweek with Carol Massar and Jason Kelly
 Bloomberg Commodities Edge with Alix Steel
 Brilliant Ideas
 Good Fortunes
 Bloomberg Real Yield with Jonathan Ferro
 Bloomberg ETF IQ with Scarlet Fu
 Studio 1.0 with Emily Chang
 High Flyers with Haslinda Amin
 Best of Bloomberg Markets Middle East with Yousef Gamal El-Din or Tracy Alloway
 Leaders with Lacqua with Francine Lacqua

Controversy

In the United Kingdom, Bloomberg Television was severely reprimanded for breach of Ofcom rules during the 2005 UK national (General) election. Bloomberg was found to have shown pro-Labour Party bias. This occurred because of a breach of British law. In the run up to a general election, television channels must provide equal time to all major political parties. Bloomberg covered the release by the Labour Party of their so-called "Business Manifesto", but did not provide counterbalancing air time to the Conservatives or Liberal Democrats.

Datascreen and news ticker
Bloomberg was well known for using a datascreen format that occupied most of the television screen and the camera shots. Until 1998, Bloomberg did not have a moving ticker. Instead, it had boxes that were dedicated to world news, as well as weather conditions in selected cities, in addition to market data which was confined to the bottom of the screen. This changed gradually to focus more on business news. The data screen was reformatted several times to include a moving stock ticker and accommodate new graphics.

The datascreen format was phased out in late 2007, where the programs were seen almost in full-screen with the ticker and headlines bar confined to the lower part of the screen. However, Bloomberg HD (available in the US only) features more data boxes on the right side of the screen compared to its SD counterpart. This effectively makes on-screen presentation on Bloomberg HD resemble the pre-2007 datascreen.

On Monday September 22, 2014, Bloomberg Television dropped the long-standing live stock ticker as part of the new on screen information format. No reason for this was given.

Other platforms
The widespread growth of mobile devices and social media have influenced sites such as Bloomberg to expand its news platforms into other areas. Bloomberg Television offers some off-air news updates via social media including Facebook,  and Twitter. Rebroadcasts of news and other special programs are additionally aired on the station's official YouTube channel "Bloomberg Television". On mobile devices, Bloomberg Television released an app available for the iPad. It is also available for free viewing on Pluto TV streaming service.

As of February 2019, the audio simulcast of Bloomberg TV is distributed on Entercom's Radio.com website and app.

See also

Bloomberg News
WBBR

References

External links

Other media
 Bloomberg radio(streaming)
 Bloomberg podcasts

1994 establishments in New York City
24-hour television news channels in the United States
Television
Business-related television channels
Cable television in the United States
English-language television stations in the United States
Foreign television channels broadcasting in the United Kingdom
Mass media companies based in New York City
Television channels and stations established in 1994
Business mass media in the United States